Lulu James is a British electronic and soul singer.

Life and career
James was born in Tanzania, descended from a Maasai tribe. She moved to the United Kingdom when she was six years old and settled in South Shields in North East England. She enrolled on a music development course, where she met her primary producer and co-writer DomZilla.

James self-released her debut EP, Rope Mirage, in 2012 and subsequently signed to Black Butter Records, which issued her debut single, "Be Safe" / "Stuck". James toured the United Kingdom in late 2012 with labelmates Hostage, Kidnap Kid, and Rudimental. By early 2013, she had signed to RCA Records and released the single "Closer". The single "Sweetest Thing" followed in late 2013, and she toured with Ellie Goulding and Annie Mac Presents. In 2014, she released the single "Beautiful People", with an EP to follow later in the year. In 2015, James served as a vocalist on house duo Gorgon City's UK tour.

James's musical inspirations include India.Arie, Beyoncé, James Blake, Mariah Carey, Diplo, Aretha Franklin, Whitney Houston, Michael Jackson, Gil Scott-Heron, Amy Winehouse, and Jamie xx.

Discography

Singles

Others
2012: Rope Mirage (EP)
2012: "Be Safe"/"Stuck"
2013: "Closer"
2013: "Step by Step"
2014: "Beautiful People"
2016: Colours (EP)
2019: "Lulu James Presents 3rdCultureKid"/"ZIM ZIMMER"

Featured in
2013: "Why Didn't You Call?" (Gang Colours feat. Lulu James)
2014: "We Disappear" (Jon Hopkins feat. Lulu James)
2015: "Loving You" (Lane 8 feat. Lulu James)
2017: "Tear My Heart"  (Moon Boots feat LuLu James [Marquis Hawkes Extended Mix])

References

External links
Official website

21st-century Black British women singers
Black Butter Records artists
British electronic musicians
British soul singers
Living people
Maasai people
Musicians from Tyne and Wear
People from South Shields
RCA Records artists
Tanzanian emigrants to the United Kingdom
1990s births